Jaison McGrath (born 8 February 1996) is a Scottish professional footballer who plays as a forward.

Career

Club career
McGrath moved from Celtic to Sunderland in August 2012. He signed for Hamilton Academical on 14 August 2013, having previously played for Bathgate Rose. He made his senior debut for Hamilton Academical three days later, on 17 August 2013, appearing as a substitute in a 4–1 home victory in the Scottish Championship.

On 27 January 2015, McGrath was released by Hamilton. After leaving Hamilton he returned to Celtic, playing in the club's Development League side.

On 2 September 2015, St Mirren announced that they had signed McGrath on a contract until the end of the 2015–16 season. McGrath made his debut for Saints in a 2–0 victory against Queen of the South just days after signing, when he appeared as a second-half substitute. He was released by St Mirren at the end of the 2015–16 season.

International career
McGrath represented Scotland at under-15, under-16 and under-17 youth international levels.

Career statistics

References

1996 births
Living people
Scottish footballers
Celtic F.C. players
Sunderland A.F.C. players
Hamilton Academical F.C. players
St Mirren F.C. players
Scottish Professional Football League players
Association football forwards